Zarechnoye is a rural locality (a selo) in Pogarsky District, Bryansk Oblast, Russia. The population was 354 as of 2010. There are 5 streets.

Geography 
Zarechnoye is located 13 km north of Pogar (the district's administrative centre) by road. Krasnaya Roshcha is the nearest rural locality.

References 

Rural localities in Pogarsky District